is a district located in Fukushima Prefecture, Japan.

As of 2003, the district has an estimated population of 38,087 and a density of 61.34 persons per km2. The total area is 620.94 km2.

Towns and villages
Hanawa
Tanagura
Yamatsuri
Samegawa

Districts in Fukushima Prefecture